There are over 20,000 Grade II* listed buildings in England. This page is a list of these buildings in the borough of Stevenage in Hertfordshire.

List

|}

Notes

External links

Stevenage Borough Council list of Listed Buildings
Listed Buildings in Stevenage at British Listed Buildings

Lists of Grade II* listed buildings in Hertfordshire
Grade II* listed buildings